Joseph Wallace (born  – 1910) was an Irish activist for vegetarianism, food reform and against vaccination.

Biography 
Wallace originally worked in the business of malting and distilling. He was the creator of the "Wallace system", a method for the cure and eradication of disease. The system included a vegetarian diet free from fermented foods; its followers were known as "Wallaceites". Wallace patented, prepared and sold several medicines, while also providing consultations.

In 1878 he married Chandos Leigh Hunt, his former patient and pupil. In 1885, with his wife, he co-wrote Physianthropy: Or, the Home Cure and Eradication of Disease, writing under the pseudonym "Lex et Lux". In October 1905, a meeting was held at Congregational Memorial Hall, London, for octogenarian vegetarians; those in attendance included Wallace (then aged 84), C. P. Newcombe, John E. B. Mayor and Isaac Pitman.

Wallace and his wife were included in Charles W. Forward's Fifty Years of Food Reform: A History of the Vegetarian Movement in England (1898). Rollo Russell cited Wallace's dietary recommendations in the "Medical Testimony" section of his 1906 book Strength and Diet.

Wallace died in 1910. C. P. Newcombe's The Manifesto of Vegetarianism (1911) contains a memorial dedication to Wallace.

Publications 

 Physianthropy: Or, the Home Cure and Eradication of Disease (with C. Leigh Hunt Wallace; 1885)
 Wallace's Complete Series of Twelve Specific Remedies for the Absolute Eradication of All Diseases, etc. (1885)
 Fermentation: The Primary Cause of Disease in Man and Animals
 Cholera: Its Prevention and Home Cure
 The Necessity of Smallpox as an Eradicator of Organic Disease

References 

1820s births
1910 deaths
19th-century Irish writers
19th-century pseudonymous writers
Alternative medicine activists
Irish activists
Irish anti-vaccination activists
Irish vegetarianism activists
Pseudoscientific diet advocates